The Amrit class of victualling barge is a pair of yardcraft built by The Peoples Engineering & Motor Works Ltd, Salkia, Howrah for the Indian Navy.

See also

References

External links

Auxiliary ships of the Indian Navy